The University of West London (UWL) is a public research university in the United Kingdom with campuses in Ealing, Brentford, and in Reading, Berkshire.

The university has roots in 1860, when the Lady Byron School was founded, later Ealing College of Higher Education. In 1992, the then named Polytechnic of West London became a university as Thames Valley University. 18 years later, after several mergers, acquisitions and campus moves, it was renamed to its current name.

The University of West London comprises nine schools: The Claude Littner Business School, the London Geller College of Hospitality and Tourism, the School of Computing and Engineering, London College of Music, the College of Nursing, Midwifery and Healthcare, the School of Law, the School of Human and Social Sciences, the School of Biomedical Sciences and the London School of Film, Media and Design.

History 

The University of West London traces its roots back to 1860, when the Lady Byron School was founded at what is now University of West London's Ealing campus. The school later became Ealing College of Higher Education.

The Slough campus was founded in January 1912 as a selective secondary school in William Street. By the 1960s, it had become Slough College of Further Education. In the 1980s it became Thames Valley College of Higher Education but was closed in 2011.

In 1991, Ealing College of Higher Education, Thames Valley College of Higher Education, Queen Charlotte's College of Health Care Studies and the London College of Music were merged to become the Polytechnic of West London. Two years later, the polytechnic became a university under the Further and Higher Education Act 1992, and adopted the name Thames Valley University. In 1994, the university merged with Northwick Park School of Nursing, Riverside College of Nursing and the North West Thames Regional Authority's AIDS unit. In 1995, it merged with the Berkshire College of Nursing and Midwifery.

In 2004, the university merged with Reading College and School of Arts and Design, which had been founded in 1947 as Reading Technical College. Reading College's sites at Kings Road and Crescent Road became TVU sites.

In 2009, the university decided to divest itself of its further education courses, together with its Kings Road site that it had inherited from the Reading College and School of Arts and Design. In May 2009, the university announced that it would be closing its Slough campus in 2010 due to the relocation of nursing students, who make up the majority of the student body there, to Reading. Other courses would be moved to one of the university's Greater London campuses. In July 2009, the university was awarded the Queen's Anniversary Prize for outstanding achievement and excellence in hospitality education.

In 2010 the responsibility for further education, along with the Kings Road site, were transferred to a relaunched Reading College. Although some 40 miles west of London, the university retained its other sites in Reading, including the Crescent Road site that also originated with Reading College and School of Arts and Design.

In August 2010, it was announced that the university would change its name to the University of West London, with the Privy Council subsequently granting permission for the change. The university unveiled a new logo in April 2011. Vice-Chancellor Peter John stated that the changes reflected the university's development since 1992 and new focus on its Brentford and Ealing campuses.

In 2015, a £100m expansion of the Ealing campus was completed. This work included new facilities such as a new library, student's union and updated teaching facilities.

In 2019 the university merged with Drama Studio London in Ealing, and in 2021 it merged with Ruskin College, Oxford.

Campuses 

There are two campus sites in western Greater London, located in St Mary's Road, Ealing and at Paragon House in Brentford. There is also a third site in Reading, Berkshire, which is some 35 miles from the Ealing sites.

In 2015, the St Mary's Road, Ealing campus underwent a £100m transformation, with a new social area, library, student's union, gym and updated facilities. In 2017, a further £1m was invested in the development of the Paragon campus in Brentford and the addition of a nursing simulation centre in the Reading campus.

The Ealing campus is home to The Heathrow Archive, a collection of more than 800 artefacts that tell the story of Heathrow airport's history from 1946 to 2016.

Organisation 
The University of West London comprises nine schools: The Claude Littner Business School, the London Geller College of Hospitality and Tourism, the School of Computing and Engineering, London College of Music, the College of Nursing, Midwifery and Healthcare, the School of Law, the School of Human and Social Sciences, the School of Biomedical Sciences, and the London School of Film, Media and Design.

The Graduate School (based in Ealing) co-ordinates and provides support to research activities and research degree courses. The University offers traditional PhD programmes and Professional Doctorates.

The university also works with the Met Film School, a private film school that is based at Ealing Studios in London, United Kingdom. The school, which launched in 2003, offers two and three-year Bachelors programs as well as various master's degree programs, which are accredited through the University of West London.

Academic reputation

Academic rankings

The new Times and Sunday Times Good University Guide 2018 rankings placed the University of West London in 56th place nationally on 24 September 2017, thus putting UWL in the top half of UK universities. On 5 September 2020, The University of West London was ranked 34th best university (out of 130+ institutions) in the UK by the 2021 edition of the Times and Sunday Times Good University Guide.

In the 2015 edition of the major rankings of British universities the university was placed 7 out of 116 in The Guardian university guide, and in 2017 the University had risen to the position of 58th. By 2021, the university had risen to 34th and the university was named the top modern university in London in The Guardian University Guide 2022. 

The University of West London has recorded the best results of any university in Greater London in the annual National Student Survey (NSS) in 2016, with students' responses showing it to be the best University in Greater London for student satisfaction. In the NSS 2016, there were 100 per cent overall satisfaction rates for nine courses across the University's eight schools, ranging from Midwifery to Business Studies and Music Technology to Hospitality Management. Among these 100 per cent overall satisfaction rates, the University recorded the best overall satisfaction rates in the UK for Civil Engineering and Building courses in the NSS 2016. In 2021, UWL was named the university of the year for student experience in The Times and Sunday Times Good University Guide.

Teaching standards
In 2009, the university was the only university to win the Queen's Anniversary Prize for outstanding achievement and excellence in hospitality education – and it regularly wins awards from major industry bodies. University of West London Careers and Employment Service is a member of the Association of Graduate Careers Advisory Services and has previously been awarded the Matrix Standard for Quality.

Student life

Students' Union
The University of West London Students' Union (UWLSU) is the recognised student organisation of the University of West London. It was ranked the best student union in Greater London in 2016. The Students' Union represents the 47,000 students at all its sites. UWLSU is affiliated to the National Union of Students.

The union has the ground floor of the North Building at the St. Mary's Road campus at which the Coffee Shop and Freddie's Bar are located, with a secondary site at the Paragon campus. The union aims to bring students the biggest events, ways to take up a new activities or sports, support and advice services, and a place to socialise.

The official radio station for the university is Blast Radio, based on campus in 'The Heartspace'.

Student accommodation

Prior to 2006 the university operated halls of residence only at the Reading campus, although a number of private houses in the Ealing area were rented by the university and allocated to students studying there. In September 2006 the university began to offer halls of residence accommodation to students from the Ealing and Slough campuses at a student and keyworker accommodation site named Paragon. The site won the 'Major Housing Project of the Year' category at the 2007 Building awards, and is in Brentford, approximately two miles away from the Ealing campus.

Paragon is home to the tallest building to be completed using Modern Methods of Construction (MMC) in the UK, which serves as a  academic facility for the university's human sciences facility. The student accommodation at Paragon had been criticised by its residents for being too expensive, costing the highest of all Greater London universities' halls of residence along with SOAS in the 2007–2008 year. TVU defended the costs, asserting that the halls are of an especially high standard.

In 2020, Notting Hill Genesis, the company that owned the Paragon student lets site, controversially closed the entire student halls of residence due to fire safety concerns, asking students to immediately evacuate. Students were moved to temporary housing in nearby Wembley whilst the university found suitable housing. Accommodation for students at UWL now varies from shared housing to student lets in Ealing, Acton and the surrounding area.

Controversies 

In the mid-1990s, its high-profile Vice-Chancellor, Mike Fitzgerald, ushered through a networked "New Learning Environment" for undergraduate students, involving a shift to online delivery and assessment. The NLE was discontinued in this form, and Fitzgerald resigned in 1998 following a negative Quality Assurance Agency report stating there were "significant management failures" in the delivery of this model. The University suffered severe financial shortfalls in the years that followed.

Notable people

Alumni

In media, music and film industry
Several alumni at the University of West London are world-famous artists, musicians, Oscar nominees and winners: 
 Freddie Mercury, lead vocalist and lyricist of the rock band Queen
 Little Simz - Twice Mercury Prize Nominated British Rapper and Actress
 Pete Townshend, Ealing Art College (UWL) – English rock guitarist, vocalist, songwriter and author
Ronnie Wood, Ealing Art College (UWL) - rock musician, songwriter, artist and author. 
Alex da Kid (English record production/songwriter, now based in LA)
 Matt Tong of Bloc Party
 Emmanuel Anyiam-Osigwe MBE, founder of British Urban Film Festival and executive producer of No Shade
 Emma Anderson musician. Songwriter, guitarist and singer in the band Lush (band).
 Ben Salter (who worked with Nile Rodgers in the United States)
 Fodhla Cronin O'Reilly, 2013 OSCAR nominee in the Best Animated Short Film
 Robert Orton (worked with Trevor Horn, The Police and won 2 Grammys for mixing Lady Gaga)
 Rebecca Harris (filmmaker), producer of The Silent Child, 2018 winner of the Academy Award for Best Live Action Short Film.
 Rosie O'Sullivan, Britain's Got Talent 2013 semi-finalist
 Joe Atkinson of Sam Fender

Business and other media
Ian Russell Carter, Hilton Worldwide executive
 Chris Galvin, BSc International Culinary Arts – Galvin Restaurants (Galvin Bistrot de Luxe, Galvin at Windows, Galvin La Chapelle, Galvin Cafe a Vin).

In politics
Yang Jiechi, Chinese diplomat
Diane James, former leader of the UK Independence Party
James Cleverly MP, Conservative Member of Parliament for Braintree, Foreign Secretary
Bello Mohammed Matawalle, Governor, Zamfara State Nigeria
Noh Bin Omar , Malaysian Politician

Staff

 Mike Fitzgerald, Vice Chancellor, 1991–1998.
 Claire Gorham, English journalist and television presenter, best known for The Girlie Show in the late 1990s.
 Mike Howlett, teacher of music technology at the university, who previously performed with the bands Gong and Strontium 90, and produced many new wave acts in the 1970s and 1980s.
 Francis Pott, Head of Composition and Research Development at the London College of Music.
 Pip Williams, teaching music technology at University
Lola Young, Baroness Young of Hornsey
David Foskett, named as one of the most influential people in public sector catering for 2013.
Christopher Small (1927–2011), musician and influential author on musicology, sociomusicology and ethnomusicology, was Senior Lecturer in Music between 1971 and 1986.
Barbara Tate (1927–2009), artist and author and an Honorary Professor of the university
Claude Littner, Honorary Professor

See also
 Armorial of UK universities
 List of universities in the UK
 Post-1992 universities

References

External links

 University of West London website
 West London Students' Union website
 London College of Music Website

 
Buildings and structures in Reading, Berkshire
Buildings and structures in Slough
Education in Reading, Berkshire
Educational institutions established in 1990
1990 establishments in England
Education in Slough
West London
WEst London